Pyotr Lvovich Vail (born 29 September 1949, Riga, Latvian SSR – 7 December 2009, Prague, Czech Republic) was a Russian author, journalist, essayist and deputy director of Radio Liberty's Russia service.

Life
Born in Riga 1949, he studied at the Moscow Polygraphic Institute. He moved to the United States in 1977, joining the station in the mid-1980s. 
He moved to the Prague headquarters in 1995. In 1995, he reported from Chechnya.
 
Vail's best-known books include Genii mesta (The Genius of Place) and Stikhi pro menya (Poems About Me). 
He produced several books with Alexander Genis, including Russkaya kukhnya v izgnanii (Russian Cuisine in Exile) and 60-e. Mir sovetskogo cheloveka (The '60s. The World of Soviet People). 
He co-edited Iosif Brodsky: trudy i dni (Joseph Brodsky: Works and Days), about Nobel Prize-winning poet Joseph Brodsky, with Lev Losev. He died in a Prague hospital.

References

1949 births
2009 deaths
Writers from Riga
Russian Jews
Russian male essayists
Russian food writers
20th-century essayists